York Federation of Students (YFS) is a student union which claims to represent approximately 55,000 students at York University in Toronto, Ontario, Canada. The York Federation of Students is a member of the Canadian Federation of Students (Local 68).

History
The student government was founded in 1968 as the York Student Council. Around 1975, the student government had become the Council of York Student Federations. By the early 1990s the name changed to York Federation of Students by their president at the time, Jian Ghomeshi (later a CBC Radio host).

About
The YFS is a dues paying student union representing over 53,000 full and part-time undergrad students at the York University.

The stated purpose of the YFS is to bring together the elected representatives of all the college governments on campus. The YFS also has appointed members of campus organizations into a single body. The YFS provides services such as a health plan and TTC post-secondary IDs. Unlike other student governments, it does not own or operate any campus pub, however, it does have a controlling stake on the Board of Directors for the Student Centre. Many campus organizations and clubs are recognized under the YFS.

Administration
The student government is administered by five full-time paid undergraduate executives, along with several full and part-time staff members. Other part-time staff are mostly made up of undergraduate students.

On multiple levels, the YFS is controlled by student volunteers and paid employees. The Day-to-day operations are overseen by the elected Executive, who also run the various campaigns and provide advocacy for all undergrads and are assisted by the full-time long-term staff.

The elected and appointed Board of Directors holds open meetings almost every other week each school year. The general membership (all York Students) meets to ratify the decisions of the Board of Directors as well as provide ground level participation to the operation of the YFS.

Elections
Elections are held every February to select the next years Executive and Board. Along with this, all the part-time positions are re-staffed annually. Volunteers also assist the YFS with campaigns and referendums on issues like the rising cost of tuition, the environment and globalization.

Board of Directors (Councillors)
YFS Board of Directors meet regularly. Only members of the Board of Directors hold voting rights.

All votes for the YFS Board of Directors are held by the Executive, and 17 college and faculty seats (College Councillors).

Services
The YFS offers a wide selection of services and advocacy programming.

Cell Phone Deals 
Free ISIC 
Free Studentsaver 
Free Essay Printing Service 
Photocopy and Fax Service 
Home4Students 
TTC Post-Secondary ID
Work Abroad Program 
Discount Auto Insurance 
Student Minutes 
U-File 
Student Advocacy Services 
Food Bank

Health Plan
All undergraduate students at York University (with the exception of Atkinson & Osgoode Hall students) participate in a health plan (YFS). 65.5% of voting Glendon College students voted to join the health plan during their 2006 Spring Elections (Elections York). Glendon College was a previous non-participant in the plan. 
Students with alternative extended health coverage are permitted to opt out of the plan.

Clubs
There are over 250 accredited clubs by the YFS. The wide variety of clubs range from cultural, religious, political, and social. For a list of clubs, check the Club List.

See also
List of Ontario students' associations
 Jian Ghomeshi, former YFS president 1990-1991

References

External links

College Councils
Faculty Councils
York University

Students
Ontario students' associations